In enzymology, a biotin—[methylmalonyl-CoA-carboxytransferase] ligase is an enzyme that catalyzes the chemical reaction

ATP + biotin + apo-[methylmalonyl-CoA:pyruvate carboxytransferase]  AMP + diphosphate + [methylmalonyl-CoA:pyruvate carboxytransferase]

The 3 substrates of this enzyme are ATP, biotin, and [[apo-[methylmalonyl-CoA:pyruvate carboxytransferase]]], whereas its 3 products are AMP, diphosphate, and methylmalonyl-CoA:pyruvate carboxytransferase.

This enzyme belongs to the family of ligases, specifically those forming generic carbon-nitrogen bonds.  The systematic name of this enzyme class is biotin:apo[methylmalonyl-CoA:pyruvate carboxytransferase] ligase (AMP-forming).   This enzyme participates in biotin metabolism.

References

 

EC 6.3.4
Enzymes of unknown structure